Mingo Branch is a stream in Tishomingo County in the U.S. state of Mississippi. It is a tributary of Cedar Creek.

Mingo is a name derived from the Choctaw language meaning "chief".

References

Rivers of Mississippi
Rivers of Tishomingo County, Mississippi
Mississippi placenames of Native American origin